The Lieber Correctional Institution  is a maximum-security state prison for men located in Ridgeville, Dorchester County, South Carolina, owned and operated by the South Carolina Department of Corrections.  

The facility was opened in 1986 and has a capacity of 1488 inmates held at maximum security.  Lieber has also housed South Carolina's death row inmates since April 12, 1997, when they were moved from Broad River Correctional Institution.  In September 2017, death row inmates were moved to Kirkland Correctional Institution.

References

Prisons in South Carolina
Buildings and structures in Dorchester County, South Carolina
1986 establishments in South Carolina